Libération-sud (French for "Liberation-South") was a resistance group active between 1940-1944 and created in the Free Zone of France during the Second World War in order to fight against the Nazi occupation through coordinated sabotage and propaganda operations.

Origins
Libération-Sud was established in a brothel of Clermont-Ferrand by an assortment of French intellectuals and activists including Emmanuel d'Astier, Pierre Kaan, Jean Cavaillès, Lucie Aubrac and Raymond Aubrac.  The first important Resistant group to emerge after the German occupation, it began publishing Libération in July 1941. With the support of Daniel Mayer and the clandestine French Section of the Workers' International (SFIO, socialist party), the Libération-sud group grew rapidly.

Relationship with other Resistance Movements
In 1942 Emmanuel d'Astier entered talks with Jean Moulin about the possibility of uniting all the resistance groups working in France. After much discussion Moulin persuaded the eight major resistance groups to form the Conseil National de la Résistance (CNR, National Council of Resistance). This included D'Astier's Libération-Sud as well as Combat (Henri Frenay), Franc-Tireur (Jean-Pierre Lévy), National Front (Pierre Villon), Comité d'Action Socialiste (Pierre Brossolette) and the Armée secrète (Charles Delestraint).

Positioning
Libération-Sud attempted to oversee and coordinate all resistance activities in the southern zones of France that were unoccupied by Nazi troops. The group positioned itself as a movement "of the left, with a strong worker presence, socialist, masonic and Christian 

Libération Newspaper

In autumn 1942, Jules Meurillon was named in charge of the propaganda and distribution service of the organization and successfully increased the annual circulation of Libération'' to over 200,000 copies by August 1944.

The paper published by Libération-Sud is the same paper that Jean-Paul Sartre and Serge July re-founded in 1973.

Members

See also 
Libération-Nord
Marguerite Gonnet—French resistance member who was part of Libération-sud
Category:Members of Liberation-Sud

References

French Resistance networks and movements
French Section of the Workers' International
Publications established in 1941
Newspapers published in France